

Portugal
 Angola –
 José Gonçalo da Gama, Governor of Angola (1779–82)
 Military junta (1782-84)
 Macau – D. Francisco de Castro, Governor of Macau (1781–83)

Colonial governors
Colonial governors
1782